Jason DeLisle (born 31 May 1972, in Sydney) is an Australian former professional boxer who competed from 2000 to 2006. He challenged for the IBF light-heavyweight title in 2006 and made six successful defences of the regional IBF Pan Pacific title.

Professional career
DeLisle finished his boxing career with a final record of 18 wins (9 by knockout), 6 losses, and 2 draws. He won the IBF  Pan Pacific light-heavyweight title in 2003 and retained the title six times. In 2006, despite losing an IBF world title #2 ranking eliminator to Julio César González, he challenged champion Clinton Woods in a rematch from their 2004 bout. Woods defeated DeLisle by sixth-round knockout to retain the title.

Professional boxing record

External links
 

1972 births
Living people
Light-heavyweight boxers
Australian male boxers